Coleophora limosipennella is a moth of the family Coleophoridae described by Philogène Auguste Joseph Duponchel in 1843. It is found in Europe from Fennoscandia to the Pyrenees, Italy and the Balkan Peninsula and from Great Britain to the Baltic States and Romania. It is an introduced species in North America.

The moth flies from June to July depending on the location.

Coleophora limosipennella larvae feed on Ulmus, and supposedly also on Alnus and Betula. Young larvae make a short, relatively wide corridor that quickly widens into an elliptic blotch. Much of the frass is ejected through the hole that the larva has made to bore itself into the leaf. The blotch is excised to make the juvenile case. The mouth angle is 0°-20°. Full-grown larvae can be found in June and July.

References

External links

 Coleophora limosipennella at UKMoths

limosipennella
Moths described in 1843
Moths of Europe
Moths of North America
Taxa named by Philogène Auguste Joseph Duponchel